The E.L.F. is a musician and music producer formed by ex-Gerling frontman Darren Cross based in Sydney, Australia, mainly working from his music production company Bernstein Studios.

History
With Gerling announcing in 2007 that they were going on an indefinite hiatus, Darren Cross began recording his debut self-produced solo E.L.F. EP Stevie Nicks Hearts at his home studio in Sydney. Along with this, Darren started up his own record label "Oaks Records".
Darren has collaborated with many different and diverse artists over his career, including Cornelius, Kylie Minogue, The Avalanches and Kool Keith.

In June 2008 The E.L.F. contributed his track "Cockroaches" to an indie compilation album titled Indiecater Vol. 1.

As of late December 2010 the E.L.F released his new album "Plankton Icke and Tina Turner David City Limits" as a free online downloadable album on the now defunct Megaupload and was downloaded over 30,000 times.

Discography

Stevie Nicks Hearts
Track listing:
"Stevie Nicks Hearts"  – 3:16
"Cockroaches"  – 4:03
"Billie"  – 3:01
"Takemeback"  – 3:07
"Billie (waterslides-trey whitty remix)"  – 5:48

Sunray in the Rave Cave
Track listing:
"Rave Cave"  – 3:22
"Big Eyed Kids"  – 3:28
"You Can't Fire Me"  – 3:43
"Bounce Bounce Bounce"  – 3:29
"Stevie Nicks Hearts-ONEMANPARTY REMIX"  – 6:18

References

External links
The E.L.F.'s Facebook
Darren's Bernstein Studios
The E.L.F.'s official Bandcamp

Australian electronic dance music groups